Gwarzo is a Local Government Area in Kano State, Nigeria. Its headquarters are in the town of Gwarzo.

It has an area of 393 km and a population of 183,987 as of the 2006 census.

The postal code of the area is 704.

Wards 
Gwarzo local government has the total number of ten wards;
 Getso
 Gwarzo
 Jama'a
 Kara
 Kutama
 Lakwaya
 Madadi
 Mainika
 Sabon Birni
 Unguwar Tudu

References

Local Government Areas in Kano State